The following is a list of famous people born in Ohio, and people who spent significant periods of their lives living in Ohio.

Actors, models, miscellaneous performers
A–B

 Jake Abel (actor) (Canton)
 Lola Albright (actor) (Akron)
 Tom Aldredge (actor) (Dayton)
 Louis Aldrich (actor) (Cincinnati)
 Corey (actor) (Cleveland)
 Roman Atwood (YouTube personality) (Millersport)
 Catherine Bach (actor) (Warren)
 Jim Backus (actor) (Cleveland)
 Kaye Ballard (actor) (Cleveland)
 Gerry Bamman (actor) (Toledo)
 Lisa Banes (actor) (Chagrin Falls)
 Theda Bara (actor) (Avondale)
 Majel Barrett (actor) (Columbus)
 Thom Barry (actor) (Cincinnati)
 Richard Basehart (actor) (Zanesville)
 Billy Bass (broadcaster) (Cleveland)
 Alan Baxter (actor) (East Cleveland)
 Vanessa Bayer (actor, comedian) (Cleveland)
 Ned Bellamy (actor) (Dayton)
 Jonathan Bennett (actor) (Rossford)
 Greg Berg (actor, voice actor) (Cleveland/Akron)
 Halle Berry (actor, fashion model) (Cleveland)
 David Birney (actor) (Cleveland)
 James R. Black (actor) (Lima, Dover)
 Susan Blackwell (actor) (Dayton)
 Nina Blackwood (veejay) (Cleveland)
 Randy Blair (actor, writer) (Ironton)
 J. Paul Boehmer (actor) (Dayton)
 Mark Boone Junior (actor) (Cincinnati)
 Andrea Bowen (actor) (Columbus)
 Bill Boyd (actor) (Hendrysburg)
 Bob Braun (talk show host) (Cincinnati)
 Thom Brennaman (sportscaster) (Cincinnati)
 Deanna Brooks (model) (Dayton)
 Richard Brooks (actor) (Cleveland)
 Charles Brown (actor) (Cleveland)
 Clancy Brown (actor) (Urbana)
 Joe E. Brown (actor) (Holgate/Toledo)
 Woody Brown (actor) (Dayton)
 Yvette Nicole Brown (actor) (Warrensville Heights)
 Tanner Buchanan (actor) (Ottawa)
 Rebecca Budig (actor) (Cincinnati)
 Jarrod Bunch (actor, ex-football player) (Ashtabula)
 Robert John Burck (born 1970) (Times Square street performer known as the Naked Cowboy)
 Michelle Burke (actor) (Defiance)
 Brandy Burre (actor) (Sandusky)
 Steve Burton (actor) (Cleveland)
 Daws Butler (voice actor) (Toledo)
 Ralph Byrd (actor) (Dayton)
 Marion Byron (actor) (Dayton)

C–D

 Mary Katherine Campbell (Miss America 1922, 1923) (Columbus)
 John Caparulo (comedian) (East Liverpool)
 Drew Carey (actor, comedian) (Clevlannnnnd boy

 Rocky Carroll (actor) (Cincinnati)
 Nancy Cartwright (voice performer) (Kettering/Dayton)
 George Chakiris (actor) (Norwood)
 Justin Chambers (actor) (Springfield)
 Damian Chapa (actor) (Dayton)
 Dave Chappelle (comedian, actor) (Yellow Springs)
 Marguerite Clark (actor) (Avondale)
 Mystro Clark (actor) (Dayton)
 George Clooney (actor) (Cincinnati)
 Bill Cobbs (actor) (Cleveland)
 Ray Combs (game show host) (Hamilton)
 Tim Conway (actor, comedian) (Willoughby)
 Chuck Cooper (actor) (Cleveland)
 Casey Cott (actor) (Chagrin Falls, Cleveland)
 Corey Cott (actor) (Chagrin Falls, Cleveland)
 Franklin Cover (actor) (Cleveland)
 Laura Cover (model) (Bucyrus)
 Yvonne Craig (actor) (Columbus)
 Jim Cummings (voice actor) (Youngstown)
 Dorothy Dandridge (actor, singer) (Cleveland)
 Beverly D'Angelo (actor) (Columbus)
 Frank Daniels (actor, Captain Jinks) (Dayton)
 Duane Davis (actor) (Cleveland)
Charles Michael Davis (actor)(Dayton)
 Doris Day (actor) (Cincinnati)
 Carmella DeCesare (model) (Avon Lake)
 Brooklyn Decker (model) (Kettering)
 Ruby Dee (actor) (Cleveland)
 Alana de la Garza (actor) (Columbus)
 John Diehl (actor) (Cincinnati)
 Phyllis Diller (actor, comedian) (Lima)
 Phil Donahue (talk show host) (Cleveland/Dayton)
 Brian Donlevy (actor) (Cleveland)
 Mike Douglas (actor) (Cleveland)
 Steve Downes (DJ and actor) (Columbus)
 Sue Downey (Miss USA 1965) (Lima)
 Hugh Downs (broadcaster) (Lima, Akron)
 Keir Dullea (actor) (Cleveland)
 Ryan Dunn (actor, stuntman) (Brockville)

E–I

 Carmen Electra (model, actor) (Cincinnati/White Oak)
 Joe Estevez (actor) (Dayton)
 Angie Everhart (fashion model) (Akron)
 Mike Faist (actor) (Gahanna)
 Sean Faris (actor, model) (Parma)
 Jamie Farr (actor) (Toledo)
 Suzanne Farrell (dancer) (Cincinnati)
 Susan Floyd (actor) (Cincinnati)
 Joe Flynn (actor) (Youngstown)
 Leo Ford (adult entertainment performer) (Dayton)
 Alan Freed (radio show host, coined phrase "rock 'n roll") (Cleveland)
 Emma Sheridan Fry (actor, writer) (Painesville)
 Clark Gable (actor) (Cadiz)
 Mike Gallagher (syndicated talk radio host) (Dayton)
 Teri Garr (actor) (Lakewood)
 Dorothy Gish (actor)
 Lillian Gish (actor) (Springfield)
 Nikki Glaser (comedian) (Cincinnati)
 Carlin Glynn (actor) (Cleveland)
 Dody Goodman (actor) (Columbus)
 Maggie Grace (actor) (Columbus)
 David Graf (actor) (Lancaster)
 Joel Grey (actor, singer, dancer) (Cleveland)
 Julie Hagerty (actor) (Cincinnati)
 Kathryn Hahn (actor) (Cleveland Heights)
 Arsenio Hall (comedian, talk show host, actor) (Cleveland)
 Porter Hall (actor) (Cincinnati)
 Margaret Hamilton (actor) (Cleveland)
 Scott Hamilton (ice skater) (Bowling Green)
 Dorian Harewood (actor) (Dayton)
 Woody Harrelson (actor) (Lebanon)
 Rachael Harris (actress/comedian) (Worthington)
 Steve Harvey (comedian/actor) (Cleveland)
 Patricia Heaton (actor) (Bay Village)
 Anne Heche (actor) (Aurora)
 Eileen Heckart (actor) (Columbus)
 Hugh Hewitt (radio talk show host) (Warren)
 Tiffany Hines (actress, singer) (Cincinnati)
 Michael Hitchcock (actor) (Defiance)
 John Hockenberry (broadcaster) (Dayton)
 Stephanie Hodge (actress) (Wilmington)
 Hal Holbrook (actor) (Cleveland)
 Michael Holley (sports commentator) (Akron)
 Lindsay Hollister (actress) (Columbus)
 John Holmes (adult entertainment performer) (Ashville)
 Katie Holmes (actor) (Toledo)
 Bob Hope (comedian, actor) (Cleveland)
 John Howard (actor) (Cleveland)
 Terrence Howard (actor) (Cleveland)
 Josh Hutcherson (actor) (Cincinnati)

J–M

 Sam Jaeger (actor, writer, and director) (Perrysburg)
 Dean Jagger (actor) (Columbus Grove)
 Elsie Janis (actor) (Columbus)
 Allison Janney (actor) (Dayton)
 Ken Jenkins (actor) (Dayton)
 Toccara Elaine Jones (contestant on America's Next Top Model) (Dayton)
 Gordon Jump (actor) (Dayton)
 Melina Kanakaredes (actor) (Akron)
 Carol Kane (actor) (Cleveland)
 Maynard James Keenan (Musician) (Ravenna)
 Michael Kent (comedian/magician) (Urbana)
 Perry King (actor) (Alliance)
 Scott Klace (actor) (Westerville)
 Robert Knepper (actor in Prison Break) (Maumee)
 Heather Kozar (model) (Akron)
 Allie LaForce (Miss Teen USA 2005) (Vermilion)
 KiKi Layne (actress) (Cincinnati)
 Eric Lange (actor) (Hamilton)
 A. J. Langer (actor) (Columbus)
 Matt Lanter (actor) (Massillon)
 Dick Latessa (actor) (Cleveland)
 Joshua LeBar (actor) (Cincinnati)
 Reggie Lee (actor) (Cleveland)
 Rex Lee (actor) (Warren)
 Hudson Leick (actor) (Cincinnati)
 Braeden Lemasters (actor) (Warren)
 Gloria LeRoy (actor) (Bucyrus)
 Ted Levine (actor) (Parma)
 Clea Lewis (actress) (Cleveland Heights)
 Mitchell Lichtenstein (actor) (Cleveland)
 John Lithgow (actor) (Yellow Springs)
 Traci Lords (actress) (Steubenville)
 Todd Louiso (actor) (Cincinnati)
 Chad Lowe (actor) (Dayton)
 Rob Lowe (actor) (Dayton)
 Paul Lynde (actor) (Mount Vernon)
 Mike Malloy (radio talk show host) (Toledo)
 Omarosa Manigault-Stallworth (reality television star) (Youngstown)
 Dean Martin (singer, actor, television show host) (Steubenville)
 Marie Masters (actor) (Cincinnati)
 Jacquelyn Mayer (Miss America 1963) (Sandusky)
 Diane McBain (actor) (Cleveland)
 Gates McFadden (actor) (Akron)
 Maeve McGuire (actor) (Cleveland)
 Eve McVeagh (actor) (Cincinnati)
 Robin Meade (news anchor, Miss Ohio 1992) (New London)
 Burgess Meredith (actor) (Cleveland)
 Marilyn Meseke (Miss America 1938) (Lima)
 Mark Metcalf (actor) (Findlay)
 W. Chrystie Miller (actor) (Dayton)
 Walter Miller (actor) (Dayton)
 David Monahan (actor) (North Olmsted)
 Debra Monk (actor) (Middletown)
 Greg Morris (actor) (Columbus)
 Martin Mull (comedian, actor) (North Ridgeville)

N–R

 John Newland (actor, director, producer, scriptwriter) (Cincinnati)
 Paul Newman (actor) (Cleveland)
 Stephen Nichols (actor) (Cincinnati)
 Danielle Nicolet (actor) (Ashtabula)
 Don Novello (comedian, actor) (Lorain)
 Maila Nurmi, Vampira (actor) (Ashtabula)
 Annie Oakley (markswoman) (Greenville)
 Ed O'Neill (actor) (Youngstown)
 Mehmet Oz (cardiothoracic surgeon, author, and television personality) (Cleveland)
 Jack Paar (talk show host) (Canton)
 Lawanda Page (actor) (Cleveland)
 Adrianne Palicki (actress) (Toledo)
 Eleanor Parker (actor) (Cedarville)
 Sarah Jessica Parker (actor) (Cincinnati/Nelsonville)
 Dan Patrick (sportscaster, talk show host) (Mason)
 Robert Patrick (actor) (Cleveland)
 Jake Paul (actor and internet personality)
 Logan Paul (actor and internet personality) 
 Austin Pendleton (actor) (Warren)
 CeCe Peniston (model, Miss Black Arizona 1989) (Dayton)
 Susan Perkins (Miss America 1978) (Monroe)
 Max Perlich (actor) (Cleveland)
 Luke Perry (actor) (Fredericktown)
 James Pickens Jr. (actor) (Cleveland)
 Tom Poston (actor) (Columbus)
 Monica Potter (actor) (Cleveland)
 Mark Povinelli (actor) (Elyria)
 Tyrone Power (actor) (Cincinnati)
 Nicole Pulliam (actor) (Columbus)
 Josh Radnor (actor) (Bexley)
 Victor Raider-Wexler (actor) (Toledo)
 Terry Ray (actor) (Grove City)
 Marge Redmond (actor) (Cleveland)
 Lili Reinhart (actress) (Cleveland)
 Gigi Rice (actor) (Westerville)
 Addison Richards (actor) (Zanesville)
 Sy Richardson (actor) (Cincinnati)
 Raven Riley (adult entertainment performer)
 Jess Robbins (actor) (Dayton)
 Zach Roerig (actor) (Montpelier)
 Roy Rogers (actor) (Cincinnati/Lucasville)
 Ted Ross (actor) (Dayton)
 Alan Ruck (actor) (Cleveland)
 Matthew Rush (adult entertainment performer) (Columbus)

S–Z

 Jeffrey D. Sams (actor) (Cincinnati)
 Gary Sandy (actor) (Dayton)
 Sherri Saum (actor) (Dayton)
 Kim Seelbrede (Miss USA 1981) (Germantown)
 William Edwin Self (actor) (Dayton)
 Joe Seneca (actor) (Cleveland)
 Molly Shannon (comedian) (Shaker Heights/Cleveland)
 Martin Sheen (actor) (Dayton)
 Victor Slezak (actor) (Youngstown)
 Candace Smith (actress / model) (Dayton)
 Mamie Smith  (singer, actress)  (Cincinnati)
 Jimmy Snyder (oddsmaker, TV commentator, "Jimmy the Greek") (Steubenville)
 Rich Sommer (actor) (Toledo)
 Hal Sparks (actor) (Cincinnati)
 Ashley Spencer (actor) (Canton)
 Jerry Springer (television talk show host/former mayor of Cincinnati) (Cincinnati)
 Dina Spybey (actor) (Columbus)
 Mark Stevens (actor) (Cleveland)
 Shannon Niquette Stewart (model) (Franklin)
 Alyson Stoner (actress/dancer) (Toledo)
 Amanda Tepe (actor) (Cincinnati)
 Philip Michael Thomas (actor) (Columbus)
 Andrea Thompson (model, broadcaster)
 Howard Thurston (magician/illusionist) (Columbus)
 Evelyn Venable (actress) (Cincinnati)
 Vera-Ellen (actress) (Norwood)
 Daniel von Bargen (actor) (Cincinnati)
 David Wain (comedian, actor) (Shaker Heights)
 Lucille Ward (actor) (Dayton)
 Ted Wass (actor) (Lakewood)
 Jerry Wasserman (actor) (Cincinnati)
 Jack Weston (actor) (Cleveland)
 Kym Whitley (actor) (Shaker Heights)
 Lee Wilkof (actor) (Canton)
 Fred Willard (actor) (Shaker Heights)
 Katt Williams (comedian, actor) (Dayton)
 De'Angelo Wilson (actor) (Dayton)
 Wendy Barrie-Wilson (actress) (Loveland)
 Debra Winger (actor) (Cleveland Heights)
 Jonathan Winters (comedian, actor) (Dayton/Springfield)
 Ray Wise (actor) (Akron)
 Daniel Wisler (actor) (Fairfield)
 Chris Wood (actor) (Dublin)
 Scott Wozniak (Youtube personality)
 Amy Yasbeck (actor) (Cincinnati)
 Barrie Youngfellow (actor) (Cleveland)
 Chad Zumock (comedian, radio personality) (Kent)

Chris Zylka (actor) (Howland township)

Artists, painters, sculptors, photographers

 Diana Al-Hadid (sculptor) (Syria/Canton)
 Daniel Arsham (painter, sculptor) (Cleveland)
 William Jacob Baer (painter) (Cincinnati)
 George Bellows (painter) (Columbus)
 Charles E. Burchfield (painter) (Ashtabula Harbor)
 Joseph DeCamp (painter) (Cincinnati)
 Jim Dine (painter, sculptor) (Cincinnati)
 Natalia Fedner (fashion designer) (Bexley)
 Dan Friedman (graphic designer) (Cleveland)
 Carl Gaertner (painter) (Cleveland)
 Ann Hamilton (artist) (Lima)
 Mark Henn (animator) (Dayton)
 Robert Henri (painter) (Cincinnati)
 Jenny Holzer (conceptual artist) (Gallipolis)
 Vance Kirkland (painter) (Convoy)
 Joseph Kosuth (conceptual artist) (Toledo)
 Janet Cook Lewis (portrait painter) (Columbus)
 Maya Lin (sculptor) (Athens)
 John Lounsbery (animator) (Cincinnati)
 Curtis Lovell II (escape artist) (Columbus)
 Catherine Opie (photographer) (Sandusky)
 Ruthe Katherine Pearlman (artist, educator) (Cincinnati)
 Robert E. L. Rainey (artist) (North Canton)
 Justin Roberts (painter)
 Aminah Robinson (artist) (Columbus)
 Herb Roe (painter) (Portsmouth)
 Alice Schille (painter) (Columbus)
 Fred Schrier (comic book artist) (Kirtland)
 Dave Sheridan (comic book artist) (Cleveland)
 Lily Martin Spencer (painter) (Avondale/Marietta)
 Tom Tsuchiya (sculptor) (Cincinnati)
 John Henry Twachtman (painter) (Cincinnati)
 Daryl Urig (illustrator, painter) (Harrison)
 Tom Wesselmann (pop artist) (Cincinnati)
 Clarence White (photographer) (West Carlisle/Newark)
 Worthington Whittredge (painter) (Springfield)
 Dare Wright (photographer, children's author) (Cleveland)
 Kane Shawn (Rapper,Hip Hop Artist) (Cleveland/Mansfield)

Sportspeople
A–B

 Dan Abbott (baseball player) (Portage County)
 Fred Abbott (baseball player) (Versailles)
 Kurt Abbott (baseball player) (Zanesville)
 A. J. Achter (baseball player) (Toledo)
 Chet Adams (football player) (Cleveland)
 Alex Albright (football player) (Cincinnati)
 Glenn Allen Jr. (racing driver) (Cincinnati)
 Will Allen (football player) (Dayton)
 Walter Alston (baseball manager) (Venice)
 Nick Altrock (baseball player) (Cincinnati)
 Red Ames (baseball player) (Warren)
 Allan Anderson (baseball player) (Lancaster)
 Harold Anderson (basketball coach) (Akron)
 Blake Annen (football player) (Upper Arlington)
 Eddie Arcaro (jockey) (Cincinnati)
 Art Arfons (land speed record tester) (Akron)
 Bob Armstrong (boxer) (Washington)
 Earl Averill Jr. (baseball player) (Cleveland)
 Randy Ayers (basketball coach) (Springfield)
 Luke Babbitt (basketball player) (Cincinnati)
 Coy Bacon (football player) (Ironton)
 Jim Bagby Jr. (baseball player) (Cleveland)
 Doug Bair (baseball player) (Defiance)
 Doc Baker (football player) (Akron)
 Jake Ballard (football player) (Springboro)
 Chris Bando (baseball player) (Solon)
 Sal Bando (baseball player) (Cleveland)
 Mike Barnett (baseball coach) (Columbus)
 Tianna Bartoletta (track athlete) (Elyria)
 Chris Bassitt (baseball player) (Toledo)
 Johnny Bates (baseball player) (Steubenville)
 Cliff Battles (Hall of Fame football player, coach) (Akron)
 Frank Baumholtz (baseball player, basketball player) (Midvale)
 Alex Bayer (football player) (Pickerington)
 Tim Belcher (baseball player) (Mount Gilead)
 David Bell (baseball manager and player) (Cincinnati)
 Le'Veon Bell (football player) (Reynoldsburg)
 Clarence Belt (racing driver) (Xenia)
 Mike Benjamin (baseball player) (Euclid)
 LeCharles Bentley (football player) (Cleveland)
 Bruce Berenyi (baseball player) (Bryan)
 Cliff Bergere (racing driver) (Toledo)
 Bob Bescher (baseball player) (London)
 Pauline Betz (tennis player) (Dayton)
 Simone Biles (gymnast) (Columbus)
 Chad Billingsley (baseball player) (Defiance)
 Mike Birkbeck (baseball player) (Orrville, Akron)
 Chase Blackburn (football player) (Marysville)
 Todd Blackledge (football player, sportscaster) (North Canton)
 Dale Blaney (racing driver) (Hartford)
 Dave Blaney (race car driver) (Hartford)
 Lou Blaney (racing driver) (Hartford)
 Ryan Blaney (race car driver) (Cortland)
 Jerry Blevins (baseball player) (Arcadia)
 Brock Bolen (football player) (Germantown)
 Barry Bonnell (baseball player, basketball player) (Milford, Columbus)
 Alex Boone (football player) (Lakewood)
 Bud Boone (racing driver) (Warren)
 Pat Borders (baseball player) (Columbus)
 Justin Boren (football player) (Pickerington)
 Chris Borland (football player) (Kettering)
 "Tough" Tony Borne (professional wrestler) (Columbus)
 Stan Boroski (baseball coach) (Martins Ferry)
 Daryl Boston (baseball player) (Cincinnati)
 Jack Bowsher (racing driver) (Harmony)
 Earl Boykins (basketball player) (Cleveland)
 Jack Boyle (baseball player) (Cincinnati)
 Andrew Brackman (baseball player) (Cincinnati)
 Bill Bradley (baseball player and manager) (Cleveland)
 Bob Brenly (baseball player, manager) (Coshocton)
 Roger Bresnahan (baseball player) (Toledo)
 Robert Brewster (football player) (Cincinnati)
 Diyral Briggs (football player) (Mount Healthy)
 Aris Brimanis (hockey player) (Cleveland)
 Ed Brinkman (baseball player) (Cincinnati)
 Adrien Broner (boxer) (Cincinnati)
 Jim Brosnan (baseball player, writer) (Cincinnati)
 Gates Brown (baseball player) (Crestline)
 Matt Brown (UFC fighter) (Xenia)
 Mike Brown (basketball coach) (Columbus)
 Paul Brown (football coach, team owner and executive) (Norwalk)
 Preston Brown (football player) (Cincinnati)
 Ray Brown (baseball player) (Alger)
 Bill Brubaker (baseball player) (Cleveland)
 Bob Brudzinski (football player) (Fremont)
 Carl Brumbaugh (football player) (West Milton)
 Phil H. Bucklew (football player) (Columbus)
 Jarrod Bunch (football player) (Ashtabula)
 Dave Burba (baseball player) (Springfield)
 Ellis Burks (baseball player) (Chagrin Falls)
 George Burns (baseball player) (Niles)
 Joe Burrow (football player) (Athens)
 Jake Butt (football player) (Pickerington)

C–D

 Carter Camper (hockey player) (Rocky River)
 Dom Capers (football coach) (Cambridge)
 Matthew Capiccioni (professional wrestler) (Brecksville)
 George Cappuzzello (baseball player) (Youngstown)
 Steve Cargile (football player) (Cleveland)
 Bobby Carpenter (football player) (Lancaster)
 Rob Carpenter (football player) (Junction City)
 Austin Carr (basketball player) (Cleveland)
 Joseph Carr (NFL president) (Columbus)
 Tank Carradine (football player) (Cincinnati)
 Butch Carter (basketball player, coach) (Middletown)
 Cris Carter (football player) (Middletown)
 Drew Carter (football player) (Solon)
 Howard Cassady (football player) (Columbus)
 Matt Cavanaugh (football player) (Youngstown)
 Brent Celek (football player) (Cincinnati)
 Andrew Chafin (baseball player) (Wakeman)
 Chris Chambers (football player) (Cleveland)
 Chris Chambliss (baseball player, coach) (Dayton)
 Dean Chance (baseball player) (Wooster)
 Ezzard Charles (boxer) (Cincinnati)
 Taco Charlton (football player) (Pickerington)
 Kwan Cheatham (born 1995) (basketball player) (Cincinnati)
 Semaj Christon (basketball player) (Cincinnati)
 Galen Cisco (baseball player and coach) (St. Marys)
 Maurice Clarett (football player) (Warren)
 Roger Clemens (baseball player) (Dayton)
 Nate Clements (football player) (Shaker Heights)
 Billy Clingman (baseball player) (Cincinnati)
 Barry Cofield (football player) (Cleveland Heights)
 Norris Cole (basketball player) (Dayton)
 Trent Cole (football player) (Xenia)
 Davon Coleman (football player) (Cleveland)
 Kurt Coleman (football player) (Clayton)
 Marco Coleman (football player) (Dayton)
 Mark Coleman (Olympic freestyle wrestler, MMA fighter) (Fremont)
 Jason Collier (basketball player) (Springfield)
 Cris Collinsworth (football player, sportscaster) (Dayton)
 Gareon Conley (football player) (Massillon)
 John Conner (football player) (Cincinnati)
 Billy Consolo (baseball player and coach) (Cleveland)
 Daequan Cook (basketball player) (Dayton)
 Larry Cox (baseball player) (Bluffton)
 Jim Cordle (football player) (Lancaster)
 Shawn Crable (football player) (Massillon)
 Estel Crabtree (baseball player (Crabtree)
 Tom Crabtree (football player) (Columbus)
 Sylvia Crawley (basketball player/coach) (Steubenville)
 Beth Crist (professional wrestler) (Dayton)
 Mark Croghan (track and field Olympian) (Green)
 Larry Csonka (Hall of Fame football player) (Stow)
 Jeff Cumberland (football player) (Youngstown)
 George Cuppy (baseball player) (Preble County)
 Stephen Curry (basketball player) (Akron)
 Scott Cursi (baseball coach) (Columbus)
 Ben Curtis (golf player) (Columbus)
 Jack Cusack (football coach and general manager) (Canton)
 Ed Cushman (baseball player) (Eagleville)
 Alissa Czisny (figure skater) (Bowling Green)
 Mark Dantonio (football coach) (Zanesville)
 Thom Darden (football player) (Sandusky)
 Helen Darling (WNBA player) (Columbus)
 Doug Dascenzo (baseball player and coach) (Cleveland)
 Fred Davis (football player) (Toledo)
 Nate Davis (football player) (Bellaire)
 Len Dawson (football player) (Alliance)
 Ed Delahanty (baseball player) (Cleveland)
 Frank Delahanty (baseball player) (Cleveland)
 Jim Delahanty (baseball player) (Cleveland)
 Josh Devore (baseball player) (Murray City)
 Jon Diebler (born 1988) - (basketball player)
 Kris Dielman (football player) (Troy)
 Dan Dierdorf (Hall of Fame football player, sportscaster) (Canton)
 Derek Dietrich (baseball player) (Cleveland)
 Cecil Dillon (hockey player) (Toledo)
 Michael Dokes (boxer) (Akron)
 Jiggs Donahue (baseball player) (Springfield)
 Andrew Donnal (football player) (Monclova)
 Red Dooin (baseball player and manager) (Cincinnati)
 Bill Doran (baseball player) (Cincinnati)
 Andy Dorris (football player) (Bellaire)
 Richard Dotson (baseball player) (Cincinnati)
 Bobby Douglas (Olympic freestyle wrestler and coach) (Bridgeport)
 Hugh Douglas (football player) (Mansfield)
 James "Buster" Douglas (boxer) (Columbus)
 Bob Dove (lineman, College Football Hall of Fame) (Youngstown)
 Dick Drago (baseball player) (Toledo)
 Dave Dravecky (baseball player) (Youngstown)
 Dick Drott (baseball player) (Cincinnati)
 Pat Duncan (baseball player) (Coalton)
 Leon Durham (baseball player) (Cincinnati)
 Duffy Dyer (baseball player) (Dayton)
 Rob Dyrdek (skateboarder) (Kettering)

E–G

 Adam Eaton (baseball player) (Springfield)
 Nate Ebner (football player and rugby Olympian) (Dublin, Cincinnati, Columbus)
 Marc Edwards (football player) (Norwood)
 Ray Edwards (football player) (Cincinnati)
 Ron Edwards (football player) (Columbus)
 Scott Effross (born 1993 (baseball pitcher)
 Jacob Eisner (Israeli basketball player) (Cincinnati)
 Pat Elflein (football player) (Pickerington)
 Nat Emerson (tennis player) (Cincinnati)
 Evan Eschmeyer (basketball player) (New Knoxville)
 Billy Evans (Baseball Hall of Fame umpire) (Youngstown)
 Lee Evans (football player) (Sandusky)
 Buck Ewing (baseball player) (Hoagland)
 James Farragher (football player, coach) (Youngstown)
 Bruce Fields (baseball player, coach) (Cleveland)
 Chris Finch (basketball coach) (Cambridge)
 Rollie Fingers (baseball player) (Steubenville)
 Sarah Fisher (race car driver) (Columbus)
 Bradley Fletcher (football player) (Youngstown)
 London Fletcher (football player) (Cleveland)
 Elmer Flick (Baseball Hall of Famer) (Bedford)
 Dezső Földes (Hungarian-born 2x Olympic champion saber fencer) (Cleveland)
 Charles Follis (football player) (Wooster)
 Wayne Fontes (football coach) (Canton)
 Matt Fox (baseball player) (Columbus)
 Rich Franklin (UFC champion) (Middletown)
 Mike Fratello (basketball coach) (Bratenahl)
 Brad Friedel (soccer goalkeeper) (Lakewood)
 Benny Friedman (1905-1982) (Hall of Fame NFL football quarterback) (Cleveland)
Ross Friedman (born 1992) (Major League Soccer player)
 Charlie Frye (football player) (Willard)
 Eric Fryer (baseball player) (Columbus)
 Mike Furrey (football player) (Grove City)
 Joey Galloway (football player) (Bellaire)
 Johnny Gargano (professional wrestler) (Cleveland)
 Jason Garrett (football player) (Hunting Valley)
 Jackie Gayda (professional wrestler) (Strongsville)
 Ben Gedeon (football player) (Hudson)
 Shelton Gibson (football player) (Cleveland Heights)
 Ted Ginn Jr. (football player) (Cleveland)
 Terry Glenn (football player) (Columbus)
 Brad Goldberg (baseball pitcher) (Cleveland)
 Bob Golic (football player, actor) (Cleveland)
 Mike Golic (football player, radio personality) (Cleveland)
 Anthony Gonzalez (football player and politician) (Cleveland)
 Jonathan Good (professional wrestler) (Cincinnati)
 Najee Goode (football player) (Cleveland)
 Ken Griffey Jr. (baseball player) (Cincinnati)
 Archie Griffin (football player) (Columbus)
 Forrest Griffin (Hall of Fame mixed martial artist) (Columbus)
 Lou Groza (football player) (Martins Ferry)
 Jon Gruden (football coach) (Sandusky)
 Matt Guerrier (baseball player) (Cleveland)

H–I

 Harvey Haddix (baseball Player) (Medway/Springfield)
 Roy Hall (football player) (South Euclid)
 Andrew Hampsten (cyclist) (Columbus)
 James Hanna (football player) (Lakewood)
 Jim Harbaugh (football player) (Toledo)
 Brett Harkins (hockey player) (North Ridgeville)
 Todd Harkins (hockey player) (Cleveland)
 Ron Harper (basketball player) (Dayton)
 James Harrison (football player) (Akron)
 Josh Harrison (baseball player) (Cincinnati)
 Peter Harrold (hockey player) (Kirtland Hills)
 Kevin Hartman (soccer player) (Athens)
 Ben Hartsock (football player) (Chillicothe)
 Don Hasselbeck (football player) (Cincinnati)
 Mickey Hatcher (baseball player, coach) (Cleveland)
 John Havlicek (basketball player) (Martins Ferry)
 A. J. Hawk (football player) (Centerville)
 Wynn Hawkins (baseball player) (Youngstown)
 Woody Hayes (football coach) (Clifton/Newcomerstown/Upper Arlington)
 Dirk Hayhurst (baseball player) (Canton)
 John Heisman (football, baseball and basketball player and coach) (Cleveland)
 Carol Heiss Jenkins (figure skating, acting) (Lakewood)
 Gus Henderson (football and basketball coach) (Oberlin)
 Tommy Henrich (baseball player) (Massillon)
 Kim Herring (football player) (Solon)
 Dan Herron (football player) (Warren)
 Jordan Hicks (football player) (West Chester)
 Tyrone Hill (basketball player, coach) (Cincinnati)
 Larry Hisle (baseball player) (Portsmouth)
 Anthony Hitchens (football player) (Lorain)
 Domenik Hixon (football player) (Whitehall)
 Robert Hoernschemeyer (football player) (Cincinnati)
 Marty Hogan (baseball player) (Youngstown)
 Cal Hogue (baseball player) (Dayton)
 Derek Holland (baseball player) (Newark)
 Lou Holtz (Football coach) (East Liverpool)
 Sam Hornish Jr. (NASCAR driver) (Defiance)
 Desmond Howard (football player) (Cleveland)
 Dummy Hoy (deaf baseball player) (Houcktown)
 Brian Hoyer (football player) (North Olmsted)
 Andy Hrovat (Olympic freestyle wrestler) (Cleveland)
Jalen Hudson (born 1996) (basketball player in the Israeli Basketball Premier League) (Akron)
 Aubrey Huff (baseball player) (Marion)
 Bob Huggins (basketball coach) (Gnadenhutten)
 Miller Huggins (Hall of Fame baseball player, manager) (Cincinnati)
 John Hughes (football player) (Gahanna)
 Kareem Hunt (football player) (Willoughby)
 Carlos Hyde (football player) (Cincinnati)
 Micah Hyde (Fostoria)
 The Irish Airborne (Dave and Mike Crist) (professional wrestlers) (Dayton)
 Shirley Fry Irvin (tennis player) (Akron)

J–M

 Jim Jackson (basketball player) (Toledo)
 LeBron James (basketball player) (Akron)
 Vic Janowicz (football player) (Elyria)
 David Jenkins (figure skating) (Akron)
 Hayes Alan Jenkins (figure skating) (Akron, Lakewood)
 Ban Johnson (baseball executive) (Norwalk)
 Gus Johnson (basketball player) (Akron)
 Home Run Johnson (baseball player) (Findlay)
 Lance Johnson (baseball player) (Cincinnati)
 Paris Johnson Jr. (football player) (Cincinnati)
 Will Johnson (football player) (Dayton)
 Cal Jones (football player) (Steubenville)
 Cardale Jones (football player) (Cleveland)
 Greg Jones (football player) (Cincinnati)
 David Justice (baseball player) (Cincinnati)
 Kyle Juszczyk (football player) (Medina)
 Rich Karlis (football player) (Salem)
 Larry Kehres (football coach) (Diamond)
 Jason Kelce (football player) (Cleveland Heights)
 Travis Kelce (football player) (Westlake)
 Clark Kellogg (basketball player) (East Cleveland)
 Leroy Kemp (freestyle wrestler) (Chardon)
 Don King (fight promoter) (Cleveland)
 DeShone Kizer (football player) (Toledo)
 Phil Klein (baseball player) (Columbus)
 Bob Knepper (baseball player) (Akron)
 Bobby Knight (basketball coach) (Massilon/Orrville)
 Jack Kralick (baseball player) (Youngstown)
 Bernie Kosar (football player) (Boardman)
 Kosta Koufos (basketball player) (Canton)
 Jordan Kovacs (football player) (Curtice)
 Kevin Kowalski (football player) (Macedonia)
 Luke Kuechly (football player) (Cincinnati)
 Jim Lachey (football player) (St. Henry)
 Jack Lambert (Hall of Fame football player) (Mantua)
 Kenesaw Mountain Landis (first baseball commissioner) (Milleville)
 Barry Larkin (baseball player) (Cincinnati)
 Cody Latimer (football player) (Dayton)
 Marshon Lattimore (football player) (Cleveland)
 Rose Lavelle (soccer player) (Cincinnati)
 Dante Lavelli (football player) (Cleveland)
 Trevor Laws (football player) (Philadelphia Eagles) (Dayton)
 Dick LeBeau (football coach) (London)
 Justin Lester (Olympic Greco-Roman wrestler) (Akron)
 Jim Leyland (baseball manager) (Perrysburg)
 Jim Leyritz (baseball player) (Lakewood/Anderson Township)
 Kory Lichtensteiger (football player) (Van Wert)
 Frank Lickliter (professional golfer) (Franklin)
 Matt Light (football player) (Greenville)
 Jon Link (baseball player) (Columbus)
 Jeff Linkenbach (football player) (Sandusky)
 Corey Linsley (football player) (Youngstown)
 David Lough (baseball player) (Akron)
 Jerry Lucas (basketball player) (Middletown)
 Rob Lytle (football player) (Fremont)
 Barry Mackay (tennis player, broadcaster) (Cincinnati)
 Mike Maddux (baseball player, coach) (Dayton)
 Paul Maguire (football player, announcer) (Youngstown)
 Ray Mancini (boxer) (Youngstown)
 Nick Mangold (football player) (Centerville)
 Mario Manningham (football player) (Warren)
 Matt Marksberry (baseball player) (Cincinnati)
 Rube Marquard (Baseball Hall of Fame pitcher) (Cleveland)
 Jim Martin (football player) (Cleveland)
 Kevin Martin (basketball player) (Zanesville)
 Justin Masterson (baseball player) (Beavercreek)
 Michael Matthews (football player) (Cincinnati)
 Scott May (basketball player) (Sandusky)
 Bill Mazeroski (baseball player) (Tiltonsville)
 Jimmy McAleer (baseball player) (Youngstown)
 Josh McDaniels (football coach) (Barberton/Canton)
 Ron McDole (football player) (Toledo)
 Roger McDowell (baseball player, coach) (Cincinnati)
 Will McEnaney (baseball player) (Springfield)
 Paul McFadden (football player) (Cleveland)
 Mike McGlynn (football player) (Austintown)
 Deacon McGuire (baseball player) (Youngstown)
 Brandon McKinney (football player) (Dayton)
 Jake McQuaide (football player) (Cincinnati)
 Lance Mehl (football player) (Bellaire)
 Zoltan Mesko (football player) (Twinsburg)
 Jack Mewhort (football player) (Toledo)
 Urban Meyer (football coach) (Ashtabula)
 Doug Mientkiewicz (baseball player) (Toledo)
 Linda Miles (professional wrestler) (Cincinnati)
 Creighton Miller (football player) (Cleveland)
 Stipe Miocic (UFC fighter) (Cleveland)
 Mike Mizanin (professional wrestler) (Cleveland)
 Dominique Moceanu (gymnast) (Hinckley)
 Antwaun Molden (football player) (Warren)
 Lance Moore (football player) (Westerville)
 Joe Morrison (football player, coach) (Lima)
 Edwin C. Moses (runner) (Dayton)
 Marion Motley (Hall of Fame football player) (Canton)
 Scott Mruczkowski (football player) (Garfield Heights)
 Byron Mullens (basketball player) (Canal Winchester)
 Thurman Munson (baseball player) (Canton)
 Chet Mutryn (football player) (Cleveland)

N–Q

 Bill Nagy (football player) (Hudson)
 Haruki Nakamura (football player) (Elyria)
 Don Nehlen (college football coach) (Mansfield)
 Al Nesser (football player) (Columbus)
 Frank Nesser (football player) (Dennison)
 Phil Nesser (football player) (Columbus)
 Ted Nesser (football player, coach) (Dennison)
 Jack Nicklaus (golfer) (Columbus)
 Joe Niekro (baseball player) (Blaine)
 Phil Niekro (baseball player) (Blaine)
 Jon Niese (baseball player) (Lima/Defiance)
 Dustin Nippert (baseball player) (Beallsville)
 Chuck Noll (football coach) (Cleveland)
 Ray Nolting (football player, coach) (Cincinnati)
 Joe Norman (football player) (Millersburg)
 Andrew Norwell (football player) (Cincinnati)
 Mike Nugent (football player) (Centerville)
 Joe Nuxhall (baseball player and sportscaster) (Hamilton)
 Annie Oakley (Wild West markswoman) (Darke)
 Owamagbe Odighizuwa (football player) (Columbus)
 Deji Olatoye (football player) (Cleveland)
 Barney Oldfield (racing driver) (Wauseon)
 Al Oliver (baseball player) (Portsmouth)
 Jerry Olsavsky (football player) (Youngstown)
 Patrick Omameh (football player) (Columbus)
 Paul O'Neill (baseball player) (Columbus)
 James Cleveland Owens "Jesse" (Runner, Olympic Champion) (Cleveland)
 Akwasi Owusu-Ansah (football player) (Columbus)
 Darrell Pace (olympic archer) (Cincinnati)
 Orlando Pace (football player) (Sandusky)
 Alan Page (Hall of Fame football player, judge) (Canton)
 Lance Palmer (MMA fighter and folkstyle wrestler) (Columbia Station)
 Betty Pariso (IFBB professional bodybuilder) (Columbus)
 Peggy Parratt (football player, coach) (Cleveland)
 Ara Parseghian (football coach) (Akron)
 Kelly Pavlik (WBC champion, boxer) (Youngstown)
 Jim Paxson (basketball player) (Dayton)
 John Paxson (basketball player) (Dayton)
 Jay Payton (baseball player) (Zanesville)
 Antwan Peek (football player) (Cincinnati)
 Mike Pelfrey (baseball player) (Wright-Patterson Air Force Base)
 Bo Pelini (football coach) (Youngstown)
 Carl Pelini (football coach) (Youngstown)
 Eduardo Pérez (baseball player) (Cincinnati)
 Tony Pike (football player) (Cincinnati)
 Brian Pillman (football player, professional wrestler) (Cincinnati)
 Antonio Pittman (football player) (Akron)
 Shawn Porter (boxer) (Cleveland)
 James Posey (basketball player) (Cleveland/Twinsburg)
 Wally Post (baseball player) (Wendelin/St. Henry)
 Matt Prater (football player) (Mayfield Heights)
 Taylor Price (football player) (Hilliard)
 Henry Prusoff (tennis player) (Cleveland)
 Brady Quinn (football player) (Columbus/Dublin)
 Chris Quinn (basketball player) (Dublin)

R–S

 Bobby Rahal (race car driver) (Medina)
 Graham Rahal (race car driver) (Columbus)
 Kevin Randleman (UFC fighter, professional wrestler, folkstyle wrestler) (Sandusky)
 Dominic Randolph (football player) (Amelia)
 Tim Rattay (football player) (Elyria)
 George Ratterman (football player) (Cincinnati)
 Jeff Reboulet (baseball player) (Kettering)
 Michael Redd (basketball player) (Columbus)
 Devine Redding (football player) (Youngstown)
 Tim Richmond (race car driver) (Ashland)
 Branch Rickey (baseball manager) (Stockdale)
 Javon Ringer (football player) (Dayton)
 Brian Roberts (basketball player) (Toledo)
 Dave Roberts (baseball player) (Gallipolis)
 Alvin Robertson (basketball player) (Barberton)
 Jamal Robertson (football player) (Springfield)
 Ryne Robinson (football player) (Toledo)
 Brian Robiskie (football player) (Cleveland)
 Chaz Roe (baseball player) (Steubenville)
 Ben Roethlisberger (football player) (Findlay)
 Dean Roll (professional wrestler) (Dayton)
 Mauri Rose (racing driver) (Columbus)
 Pete Rose (baseball player, manager) (Cincinnati)
 Scott Roth (basketball player, coach) (Cleveland)
 Edd Roush (baseball player) (Cincinnati)
 Eric Rowe (football player) (Cleveland)
 Tommy Rowlands (freestyle and folkstyle wrestler) (Columbus)
 Terry Rozier (basketball player) (Youngstown)
 Ryan Rua (baseball player) (Amherst)
 Kyle Rudolph (football player) (Cincinnati)
 Mike Rupp (hockey player) (Cleveland Heights)
 Gary Russell (football player) (Columbus)
 Rodger Saffold (football player) (Bedford)
 Perry Saturn (professional wrestler) (Cleveland)
 "Macho Man" Randy Savage (professional wrestler) (Columbus)
 Bo Schembechler (football coach) (Barberton)
 Mike Schmidt (baseball player) (Dayton)
 Bob Schul (runner, Olympic gold medalist) (West Milton)
 Kyle Schwarber (baseball player) (Middletown)
 Devon Scott (born 1994), basketball player in the Israel Basketball Premier League
 Adam Shaheen (football player) (Galena)
 Travis Shaw (baseball player) (Washington Court House)
 Cecil Shorts III (football player) (Kent)
 George Shuba (baseball player) (Youngstown)
 J. B. Shuck (baseball player) (Galion)
 Don Shula (football coach) (Painesville)
 Larry Shyatt (basketball coach) (Cleveland)
 Larry Siegfried (basketball player) (Shelby)
 John Simon (football player) (Youngstown)
 Rob Sims (football player) (Macedonia)
 Frank Sinkwich (Heisman Trophy recipient) (Youngstown)
 George Sisler (baseball player) (Manchester)
 Brad Smith (football player) (Youngstown)
 Joe Smith (baseball player) (Cincinnati)
 Katie Smith (basketball player) (Logan)
 Robert Scott Smith (football player) (Euclid)
 Steve Smith (baseball coach) (Canton)
 Troy Smith (football player) (Cleveland)
 Dawuane Smoot (football player) (Groverport)
 Al Snow (professional wrestler) (Lima)
 Bob Snyder (football player, coach) (Toledo)
 Andy Sonnanstine (baseball player) (Barberton)
 Tim Spencer (football player, coach) (Martins Ferry)
 Craig Stammen (baseball player) (Versailles/North Star)
 Roger Staubach (football player) (Cincinnati)
 Harry Steel (Olympic freestyle wrestler) (East Sparta)
 Dominique Steele (mixed martial artist) (Norwood)
 George Steinbrenner (owner of NY Yankees) (Rocky River)
 Shannon Stewart (baseball player)
 Logan Stieber (freestyle and folkstyle wrestler) (Monroeville)
 Steve Stone (baseball pitcher, sportscaster) (South Euclid)
 Carl Storck (NFL president) (Dayton)
 Zach Strief (football player) (Cincinnati)
 Korey Stringer (football player) (Warren)
 Tyrell Sutton (football player) (Akron)
 Nick Swisher (baseball player) (Worthington)

T–Z

 Bill Talbert (tennis player) (Cincinnati)
 Aqib Talib (football player) (Cleveland)
 Ben Taylor (football player) (Bellaire)
 David Taylor (Olympic freestyle wrestler) (St. Paris)
 Kent Tekulve (baseball player) (Hamilton)
 Matt Tennant (football player) (Cincinnati)
James Terry (born 1960) (American-Israeli basketball player) (Cleveland)
Joe Thomasson (born 1993) (basketball player in the Israel Basketball Premier League)
 LaSalle Thompson (basketball player, coach) (Cincinnati)
 Hugh Thornton (football player) (Oberlin)
 Joe Thuney (football player) (Centerville)
 Nate Thurmond (Hall of Fame basketball player) (Akron)
 Mike Tolbert (football player) (Centerville)
 Steve Tovar (football player) (Elyria)
 Tony Trabert (tennis player) (Cincinnati)
 Jim Tracy (baseball player, manager) (Hamilton)
 Demetrius Treadwell (basketball player) (Cleveland)
 Gary Trent (basketball player) (Columbus)
 Jim Tressel (football coach) (mentor)
 Lee Tressel (Hall of Fame college football coach) (Ada)
 Danny Trevathan (football player) (Youngstown)
 Mike Trgovac (football coach) (Youngstown)
 Mitchell Trubisky (football player) (mentor)
 Mel Tucker (football coach) (Cleveland)
 Tyler Ulis (basketball player) (Lima)
 Brandon Underwood (football player) (Hamilton)
 Zach Veach (race car driver) (Stockdale)
 Louie Vito (snowboarder) (Bellefontaine)
 Doug Volmar (hockey player) (Cleveland)
 Joe Vosmik (baseball player)
 Mike Vrabel (football player) (Akron/Cuyahoga Falls)
 Neal Walk (1948–2015) (basketball player) (Cleveland)
 Bill Walker (basketball player) (North College Hill)
 Moses Fleetwood Walker (baseball player) (Mount Pleasant)
 Randy Walker (college football coach) (Troy)
 Vance Walker (football player) (Cincinnati)
 Spencer Ware (football player) (Cincinnati)
 Paul Warfield (football player) (Warren)
 Rau'shee Warren (boxer) (Cincinnati)
 Jimmy Wasdell (baseball player 1st base/outfield) (Cleveland/Eastlake)
 Nate Washington (football player) (Toledo)
 Nick Weatherspoon (basketball player) (Canton)
 Beanie Wells (football player) (Akron)
 Jayson Wells (born 1976) (basketball player) (Cleveland)
 Rick White (baseball player) (Springfield)
 Sheldon White (football player) (Dayton)
 Sol White (baseball player, manager, executive) (Bellaire)
 Donte Whitner (football player) (Cleveland)
 Matt Wilhelm (football player) (Lorain)
 Jeff Wilkins (football player) (Youngstown)
 Herb Williams (basketball player, coach) (Columbus)
 Jawad Williams (basketball player) (Cleveland/Lakewood)
 Bill Willis (Hall of Fame football player) (Columbus)
 Russell Wilson (football player) (Cincinnati)
 Mike Windt (football player) (Cincinnati)
 Antoine Winfield (football player) (Akron)
 Matt Wisler (baseball player) (Bryan)
 Derek Wolfe (football player) (Lisbon)
 Eric Wood (football player) (Cincinnati)
 Gene Woodling (baseball player) (Akron)
 Charles Woodson (football player) (Fremont)
 Chris Wormley (football player) (Toledo)
 Chris Wright (basketball player) (Trotwood)
 Mike Wright (football player) (Cincinnati)
 Kevin Youkilis (baseball player) (Cincinnati)
 Cy Young (baseball player) (Gilmore/Newcomerstown)
 Dolph Ziggler (professional wrestler) (Cleveland)
 Don Zimmer (baseball player, coach) (Cincinnati)
 Ron Zook (football coach) (Loudonville)
 Michael Zordich (football player) (Youngstown)

Journalists, writers, cartoonists, poets, authors, playwrights, screenwriters, film directors and producers
A–F

 Berenice Abbott (photographer) (Springfield)
 Karen Ackerman (author) (Cincinnati)
 Julia Carter Aldrich (author, editor) (Liverpool)
 Dede Allen (film editor) (Cleveland)
 Eunice Gibbs Allyn (author) (Brecksville)
 Sherwood Anderson (author) (Camden/Clyde)
 R. W. Apple Jr. (journalist and author) (Akron)
 Helen Vickroy Austin (journalist, horticulturist) (Miamisburg)
 Brian Azzarello (comic book writer) (Cleveland)
 Jamie Babbit (film director, producer, screenwriter) (Shaker Heights)
 Libbie C. Riley Baer (poet) (Bethel)
 Bill Balas (screenwriter and director) (Cleveland)
 Melissa Elizabeth Banta (poet) (Cheviot)
 Natalie Barney (author) (Dayton)
 Dorothy Barresi (poet) (Akron)
 Billy Bass (radio host, program director) (Cleveland)
 Margret Holmes Bates (author) (Fremont)
 Tom Batiuk (cartoonist) (Akron)
 William Bayer (crime fiction author) (Cleveland)
 Brian Michael Bendis (comic book writer) (Cleveland)
 Ambrose Bierce (author) (Meigs County)
 Hanne Blank (author) (Cleveland)
 Erma Bombeck (newspaper columnist, author) (Dayton)
 Christine Brennan (sportswriter) (Toledo)
 Douglas Brinkley (author and professor) (Perrysburg)
 Louis Bromfield (author) (Mansfield)
 Raymond Buckland (author) (Warren)
 Michael Buckley (author) (Akron)
 Milton Caniff (cartoonist) (Dayton)
 Vincent J. Cardinal (playwright and director) (Kent)
 Alice Cary (poet) (Cincinnati)
 Charles Chesnutt (writer) (Cleveland)
 Gordon Cobbledick (Sports Editor, Author, War Correspondent (Cleveland)
 Bud Collins (journalist) (Lima)
 Gail Collins (journalist) (Cincinnati)
 Chris Columbus (film director) (Warren)
 Eliza Archard Conner (journalist, lecturer) (Monroe Township)
 Jerome Corsi (author) (East Cleveland)
 Carol Costello (television correspondent) (Minerva)
 Hart Crane (poet) (Garrettsville)
 Wes Craven (film director) (Cleveland)
 Anne Virginia Culbertson (writer) (Zanesville)
 Michael Cunningham (author) (Cincinnati)
 Steve Curwood (journalist, author) (Yellow Springs)
 William H. Daniels (cinematographer) (Cleveland)
 Khashyar Darvich (film producer, director) (Oxford, Cleveland)
 Stephen Donaldson (author) (Cleveland)
 Rita Dove (poet) (Akron)
 Elizabeth Drew (journalist, author) (Cincinnati)
 Paul Laurence Dunbar (poet) (Dayton)
 Jane Dunnewold (author) (Oberlin)
 Harlan Ellison (author) (Cleveland)
 Mel Epstein (film producer) (Dayton)
 Joe Eszterhas (screenwriter) (Cleveland)
 Dominick Evans (filmmaker/activist) (Toledo)
 Lydia Hoyt Farmer (author, women's rights activist) (Cleveland)
 George Fett (cartoonist) (Cleveland)

G–M

 Atul Gawande (journalist, physician) (Athens)
 Elizabeth George (novelist) (Warren)
 Paul Gilger (playwright, set designer, architect) (Mansfield)
 Florence Magruder Gilmore (religious writer, novelist, translator (Columbus)
 Bob Greene (columnist, author) (Columbus)
 Zane Grey (author) (Zanesville)
 Cathy Guisewite (cartoonist) (Dayton)
 Stephen Gyllenhaal (film director, poet) (Cleveland)
 Margaret Peterson Haddix (author) (Columbus)
 Virginia Hamilton (children's author) (Yellow Springs)
 Benjamin Hanby (writer, composer) (Rushville, Westerville)
 Bill Hemmer (television journalist) (Cincinnati)
 William Dean Howells (author, critic)
 Elizabeth O. Sampson Hoyt (philosopher, author) (Athens)
 Langston Hughes (poet) (Cleveland)
 Florence Huntley (journalist, author and humorist) (Alliance)
 Margaret E. Ingalls (author, liturgist) (Logan)
 Mary Bigelow Ingham (writer, educator, social activist) (Mansfield)
 Jeff Jacoby (journalist) (Cleveland)
 Jim Jarmusch (film director) (Akron)
 Douglas Kenney (comedy writer, actor) (Chagrin Falls) 
 Joe Kernen (television journalist) (Cincinnati)
 Katharine Kerr (sci-fi/fantasy author) (Cleveland)
 Glenn Kessler (correspondent) (Cincinnati)
 Eric Kripke (writer, director) (Toledo)
 Robert Kurtzman (film director, screenwriter) (Crestline)
 Jerome Lawrence (writer) (Cleveland)
 Robert E. Lee (writer) (Elyria)
 Sorche Nic Leodhas (writer) (Youngstown)
 Brett Leonard (film director) (Toledo)
 Mark L. Lester (film director) (Cleveland)
 Ann Liguori (radio personality) (Cincinnati)
 Dwight H. Little (director) (Cleveland)
 Bryan Malessa (author) (Chagrin Falls)
 Louise Markscheffel (newspaper editor and critic) (Toledo)
 Lida Rose McCabe (author, journalist, lecturer) (Columbus)
 J. E. McConaughy (litterateur, author) (Twinsburg)
 Jennie McCowen (physician, medical journal editor) (Harveysburg)
 Robin Meade (television journalist) (New London)
 Nick G. Miller (screenwriter, producer, director) (Dayton)
 Dan Moldea (author) (Akron)
 Christopher Moore (author) (Toledo)
 Patt Morrison (journalist) (Utica)
 Toni Morrison (author) (Lorain)

N–Z

 Dudley Nichols (screenwriter) (Wapakoneta)
 Andre Norton (author) (Cleveland)
 John O'Brien (novelist) (Oxford)
 Frederick Burr Opper (cartoonist) (Madison)
 P. J. O'Rourke (political satirist, author) (Toledo)
 Paul Palnik (artist, cartoonist) (Cleveland)
 Harvey Pekar (author) (Cleveland)
 Jack Perkins (journalist, author) (Cleveland)
 Eleanor Perry (screenwriter) (Cleveland)
 Bob Peterson (animator, director) (Wooster/Dover)
 Christopher Pfaff (producer, actor, clothing designer) (Akron)
 Dav Pilkey (author) (Cleveland)
 David Pogue (columnist) (Shaker Heights)
 Dawn Powell (author) (Mount Gilead)
 Ted Rall (editorial cartoonist) (Kettering)
 Ellen Ratner (Fox News analyst) (Cleveland)
 Robert Rehme (film producer) (Cincinnati)
 Rosella Rice (writer, poet) (Perrysville)
 Les Roberts (mystery novel writer) (author) (Cleveland Heights)
 Effie Hoffman Rogers (editor, journalist, educator) (Jackson)
 Terry Ryan (author) (Defiance)
 Bill Sammon (television journalist) (Cleveland)
 Martin Savidge (television journalist) (Rocky River)
 John Scalzi (author) (Bradford)
 Tara Seibel (artist, cartoonist) (Pepper Pike)
 Dominic Sena (film director) (Niles)
 Joe Shuster (co-creator of Superman) (Cleveland)
 Jerry Siegel (co-creator of Superman) (Cleveland)
 Marisa Silver (film director) (Shaker Heights)
 David C. Smith (novelist) (Youngstown)
 Jeff Smith (cartoonist) (Columbus)
 Maggie Smith (poet, freelance writer, and editor)
 Tony Snow (television journalist) (Cincinnati)
 Steven Spielberg (film director, producer) (Cincinnati)
 Cornelia Laws St. John (poet, biographer) (College Hill)
 R. L. Stine (author) (Columbus )
 Harriet Beecher Stowe (author) (Cincinnati)
 Gertrude Strohm (author, compiler, game designer) (Greene County)
 Lowell Thomas (commentator, author) (Woodington)
 James Thurber (author, cartoonist) (Columbus)
 George Trendle (radio/TV producer) (Norwalk)
 Emma Rood Tuttle (writer, poet) (Braceville Township)
 Lee Unkrich (film director and editor) (Cleveland)
 Michael Wadleigh (film director) (Akron)
 Paula Wagner (film producer) (Youngstown)
 Brad Warner (author) (Akron)
 Jack L. Warner (movie mogul) (Youngstown)
 Harvey Wasserman (author, political activist) (Columbus)
 Lew Wasserman (studio executive) (Cleveland)
 Daniel Waters (screenwriter) (Cleveland)
 Bill Watterson (cartoonist) (Chagrin Falls)
 Sharon Waxman (born c.1963) (journalist)
 Laura Rosamond White (author, poet, editor) (Geneva)
 David Whitney (author) (Youngstown)
 Gerri Willis (television journalist) (Cincinnati)
 M. Wintermute (poet, author) (Berkshire)
 Charles Woodson (football) (Fremont)
 James Wright (poet) (Martins Ferry)
 John Yang (television journalist) (Chillicothe)

Politicians, public servants, public officeholders

A–L

 Charles Anderson (Ohio governor) (Dayton)
 Frank J. Battisti (judge, U.S. District Court for the Northern District of Ohio) (Youngstown)
 Albert J. Beveridge (political leader) (Highland)
 Ken Blackwell (politician) (Cincinnati)
 Blue Jacket (Shawnee Indian Chief) (presently known as Ross County)
 John Boehner (U.S. Speaker of the House) (Reading/West Chester)
 John Brough (politician, Ohio governor) (Marietta)
 Henry Lawrence Burnett (prosecutor in trial for Abraham Lincoln assassination) (Youngstown)
 Prescott Bush (U.S. Senator, businessman) (Columbus)
 William Case (Cleveland)
 Steve Chabot (politician, U.S. representative) (Cincinnati)
 Salmon P. Chase (Ohio governor, abolitionist, U.S.Treasury Secretary and Chief Justice) (Cincinnati)
 Gary Cohn (National Economic Council Director) (Shaker Heights)
 James M. Cox (Governor, Presidential candidate, Media mogul) (Dayton)
 Ephraim Cutler (a framer of Ohio Constitution, abolitionist, longtime Ohio University Trustee (Ames Twp)
 Charles G. Dawes (politician)
 William R. Day (US Supreme Court Justice) (Ravenna/Canton)
 John Dean (White House Counsel to President Nixon) (Akron)
 R. Michael DeWine (politician, U.S. Senator) (Cedarville)
 Steve Driehaus (politician, U.S. representative) (Cincinnati)
 James A. Garfield (Civil War general, 20th President of the United States) (Moreland Hills)
 James Rudolph Garfield (U.S. Interior Secretary)
 John J. Gilligan (politician, Ohio Governor)
 John Glenn  (U.S. Senator, astronaut)
 Bill Gradison (politician, U.S. representative)
 Ulysses S. Grant (soldier, politician, 18th President of the United States) (Point Pleasant)
 Joe Hagin (White House Deputy Chief of Staff) (Indian Hill)
 Warren G. Harding (29th President of the United States) (Blooming Grove/Caledonia)
 Marie Harf (State Dept. spokesperson) (Granville)
 Andrew L. Harris (Civil War general, U.S. Commissioner, Ohio Governor)
 Benjamin Harrison (soldier, politician, 23rd President of the United States) (North Bend)
 William Henry Harrison (soldier, politician, 9th President of the United States) (North Bend)
 Rutherford B. Hayes (politician, 19th President of the United States) (Delaware)
 Dave Hobson (politician, U.S. representative) (Springfield)
 Darrell Issa (politician, U.S. representative) (Cleveland)
 Cheryl Johnson (judge, Texas Court of Criminal Appeals) (Columbus)
 Nathaniel R. Jones (judge, U.S. Court of Appeals, Sixth Circuit) (Youngstown)
 Marcy Kaptur (politician, U.S. representative) (Toledo)
 John Kasich (politician, former Representative from Ohio (1983-2001), and former Governor of Ohio) (Pittsburgh/Columbus)
 Michael J. Kirwan (politician, U.S. representative) (Youngstown)
 John Koskinen (IRS Commissioner) (Cleveland)
 Dennis Kucinich (politician) (Cleveland)
 Alan George Lance, Sr. (judge, politician, and the National Commander of The American Legion 1999–2000) (McComb)
 Kenesaw Mountain Landis (federal judge, baseball commissioner) (Millville)
 Frank Lausche (Ohio Senator and Governor)
 Susie Lee (politician, U.S. representative) (Canton)
 Lucile Petry Leone (Cadet Nurse Corps, Assistant Surgeon General) (Preble County)

M–Z

 Omarosa Manigault (Assistant to the President) (Youngstown)
 John Michael Manos (federal judge) (Cleveland)
 Neil H. McElroy (businessman, cabinet secretary)
 William McKinley (25th President of the United States) (Niles)
 Howard Metzenbaum (Senator from Ohio) (Cleveland)
 Arthur Ernest Morgan (college president, hydraulic engineer, TVA administrator)
 Chief Pontiac (Ottawa Indian Chief)
 James A. Rhodes (politician, Ohio Governor) (Jackson)
 Christina Romer (chair of Council of Economic Advisers) (Canton)
 Edward James Roye, (5th President of Liberia) (Newark)
 Charles Ruff (White House Counsel) (Cleveland)
 William Saxbe (U.S. Senator, U.S. Attorney General, Ambassador to India) (Mechanicsburg)
 Kathleen Sebelius (U.S. Secretary of Health and Human Services, former Governor of Kansas) (Cincinnati)
 Donna Edna Shalala (U.S. Secretary of Health and Human Services, 1993–
 John Sherman (U.S. Senator, brother of Gen. Sherman) (Lancaster)
 Tony Snow (White House Press Secretary) (Cincinnati)
 Charles Phelps Taft II (Mayor of Cincinnati)
 Robert A. Taft I (politician) (Cincinnati)
 Robert A. Taft II (politician, Ohio governor)
 Robert Taft Jr.
 William Howard Taft (politician, jurist, 27th President of the United States, chief justice) (Cincinnati)
 Norman Thomas (politician) (Marion)
 David Tod (governor) (Youngstown)
 Albion Tourgée (activist for civil rights, author, lawyer) (Kingsville)
 James Traficant (politician, U.S. representative) (Youngstown)
 Clement Vallandigham (politician, activist) (Dayton)
 Stephen Venard (lawman) (Lebanon)
 George Voinovich (politician) (Cleveland)
 Brand Whitlock (politician, diplomat)
 Jay Williams (mayor) (Youngstown)
 Mary Ellen Withrow (U.S. Treasurer) (Marion)
 Victoria Claflin Woodhull (first woman to be nominated for president) (Homer, Licking County)

Miscellaneous celebrities

 Clyde Beatty (animal trainer) (Chillicothe)
 Brenda Carlin (television producer, wife of George Carlin) (Dayton)
 Steve Cook (pool player) (Lima)
 Mark Fischbach (YouTuber) (Cincinnati)
 Jack Hanna (zoo director, animal expert) (Columbus)
 The Naked Cowboy (entertainer) (Cincinnati)
 Nettie Metcalf (farmer, chicken breeder) (Warren)
 Daniel Nardicio (marketing director of Playgirl) (Cleveland)
 Matthew Patrick (internet personality) 
 Danielle Reyes (contestant on Big Brother 3) (Dayton)
 Scott Wozniak (YouTuber)

Military leaders

 "Mad" Ann Bailey (scout and spy for pioneers) (Harrison)
 Phil H. Bucklew (Navy officer) (Columbus)
 Don Carlos Buell (Civil War General) (Lowell)
 Cook Cleland (WW2 Navy Flying Ace, Post War Air Race Winner) (Cleveland)
 George Crook (cavalry officier) (Taylorsville)
 George Custer (cavalry officer) (New Rumley)
 Benjamin O. Davis Jr. (first African-American general in U.S. Air Force) (Cleveland)
 William A. Foster (Medal of Honor Recipient) (Cleveland)
 Dominic S. Gentile (World War II flying ace, first to break Rickenbacker's wartime kill record) (Piqua)
 Ulysses S. Grant (Civil War general, politician) (Point Pleasant)
 Andrew L. Harris (Civil War general, U.S. Commissioner, Ohio Governor)
 Simon Kenton (soldier, frontiersman, friend of Daniel Boone) (Urbana)
 Isaac C. Kidd (Rear Admiral USN) (killed on USS Arizona, Medal of Honor) (Cleveland)
 Ernest Joseph King (Commander in Chief, United States Fleet and Chief of Naval Operations during World War II) (Lorain)
 Whitmore Knaggs (soldier, spy)
 William C. Lambert (World War I aviator, fighter ace) (Ironton)
 Justin LeHew (Sergeant Major USMC; hero of Nasiriyah; Navy Cross, Bronze Star with Combat "V"; nominated for the Medal of Honor) (Columbus Grove)
 Curtis LeMay (founder of Strategic Air Command) (Columbus)
 Donald Russell Long (Medal of Honor, Vietnam)
 Jacob Parrott (first recipient of the Medal of Honor) (Fairfield County)
 Eddie Rickenbacker (pilot, race car driver) (Columbus)
 Robert C. Schenck (Civil War general, politician, diplomat) (Dayton)
 Philip Sheridan (Civil War general) (Somerset)
 William Tecumseh Sherman (Civil War general) (Lancaster)
 Tecumseh (Native American leader)
 Paul Tibbets (pilot of Enola Gay, World War II) (Columbus)
 Robert B. Wood (Civil War sailor, Medal of Honor) (New Garden)
 Rodger Young (World War II soldier) (Fremont)
 Hunter Windham (porn director) (Sebring)

Architects, inventors, explorers, adventurers, astronauts, aviators, spies

 Conrad Keene Allen (exploration geologist) (Norwalk)
 Neil Armstrong (astronaut, first man on the moon) (Wapakoneta/St. Marys)
 George Bartholomew (inventor)
 Norman Bel Geddes (industrial designer) (New Philadelphia)
 Guion S. Bluford Jr. (astronaut)
 Mark N. Brown (astronaut) (Dayton)
 Charles Brush (inventor, industrialist) (Cleveland)
 Kenneth D. Cameron (astronaut) (Cleveland)
 Dave Canterbury (co-star of Dual Survival)
 Nancy Currie (astronaut)
 Thomas Edison (inventor) (Milan)
 Donn F. Eisele (astronaut)
 Frederick W. Garber (architect) (Cincinnati)
 Michael L. Gernhardt (astronaut)
 Cass Gilbert (architect) (Zanesville)
 Paul Gilger (architect, set designer, playwright) (Mansfield)
 John Glenn (astronaut, politician, First American to orbit earth) (Cambridge/New Concord)
 Michael T. Good (astronaut)
 Elisha Gray (inventor) (Barnesville)
 Gary Haney (architect) (Middletown)
 Samuel Hannaford (architect) (Cincinnati)
 Greg Harbaugh (astronaut) (Cleveland)
 Karl G. Henize (astronaut)
 Thomas J. Hennen (astronaut)
 Terence T. Henricks (astronaut)
 Tom Henricks (astronaut)
 Charles O. Hobaugh (astronaut) (North Ridgeville)
 Philip Johnson (architect) (Cleveland)
 Frederick McKinley Jones (inventor) (Cincinnati)
 Charles Kettering (inventor) (Loudenville/Dayton)
 Jim Lovell (astronaut) (Cleveland)
 G. David Low (astronaut) (Cleveland)
 Garrett Morgan (inventor) (Cleveland)
 Russell C. Newhouse (inventor) (Clyde)
 Robert F. Overmyer (astronaut)
 Ronald A. Parise (astronaut)
 James Polshek (architect) (Akron)
 Judith Resnik (astronaut) (Akron)
 Ron Sega (astronaut) (Cleveland)
 Howard Dwight Smith (architect) (Dayton/Columbus)
 Oberlin Smith (engineer) (Cincinnati)
 Robert C. Springer (astronaut) (Ashland)
 Kathryn D. Sullivan (astronaut)
 Don Thomas (astronaut)
 Ernest H. Volwiler (inventor) (Hamilton)
 Carl Walz (astronaut) (Cleveland)
 Mary Ellen Weber (astronaut) (Cleveland)
 Alexander Winton (inventor) (Cleveland)
 Granville Woods (inventor) (Columbus/Cincinnati)
 Orville Wright and Wilbur Wright (inventors) (Dayton)

Businesspeople, entrepreneurs

 John Chambers (CEO of Cisco Systems) (Cleveland)
 Henry D. Coffinberry (industrialist) (Cleveland)
 John R. Commons (economist) (Hollansburg)
 Edward J. DeBartolo, Sr. (developer, real estate magnate) (Youngstown)
 Larry Dolan (owner of the Cleveland Indians) (Cleveland Heights)
 Paul Dolan (CEO of the Cleveland Indians) (Chardon)
 Herbert H. Dow (chemist, industrialist) (Cleveland)
 Benjamin Franklin Fairless (steel company executive) (Pigeon Run)
 Harvey Samuel Firestone (founder of Firestone, inventor, industrialist) (Columbiana/Akron)
 John W. Galbreath (real estate mogul, owned Pittsburgh Pirates and Darby Dan Farm) (Columbus)
 Charles Geschke (co-founder of Adobe Systems) (Cleveland)
 B. F. Goodrich (industrialist) (Akron)
 Jeff Immelt (chairman and CEO of GE) (Cincinnati)
 Charles Keating (banker, activist) (Cincinnati)
 Charles F. Kettering (inventor, industrialist, philanthropist) (Loudonville/Dayton)
 James Michael Lafferty CEO of Fine Hygienic Holding ; prior CEO within Procter and Gamble, Coca-Cola, and British American Tobacco. Olympic Track and Field Coach. (Cincinnati)
 Peter B. Lewis (entrepreneur, philanthropist, activist) (Cleveland)
 Carl Lindner (entrepreneur, political contributor, philanthropist) (Cincinnati)
 Brian Moynihan (CEO of Bank of America) (Marietta)
 Henry Nicholas (co-founder of Broadcom Corporation) (Cincinnati)
 Ransom Olds (automaker, Oldsmobile) (Geneva)
 James Ward Packard (automaker) Packard (Born Warren, Died Cleveland)
 William Doud Packard (automaker) Packard (Warren)
 Don Panoz (entrepreneur) (Alliance)
 John H. Patterson (industrialist) (Dayton)
 Roger Penske (racing driver, entrepreneur) (Shaker Heights)
 Ira M. Petersime (inventor, entrepreneur, industrialist) (Webster)
 William Procter (industrialist) (Cincinnati)
 Bruce Ratner (real estate developer, owned the New Jersey Nets) (Cleveland)
 John D. Rockefeller (industrialist) (Strongsville/Cleveland)
 Michael J. Saylor (co-founder of MicroStrategy) (Fairborn)
 Ernesto Schmitt (entrepreneur) (Cincinnati)
 Frank Seiberling (industrialist) (Goodyear Tire & Rubber Co.)
 Gary Shilling (financial analyst and commentator) 
 David Sinton (industrialist) (Cincinnati)
 George Steinbrenner (shipping magnate, owned the New York Yankees) (Cleveland)
 W. D. Twichell (Texas surveyor) (reared in Madison County, educated in Lebanon, Ohio)
 Ronald Wayne (co-founder of Apple Inc.) (Cleveland)
 Ralph Wilson (Hall of Fame owner of the Buffalo Bills) (Columbus)
 Denise DeBartolo York (co-chair of the San Francisco 49ers) (Youngstown)
 Jed York (president and owner of the San Francisco 49ers) (Youngstown)

Publishers, media moguls

 Roger Ailes (former chairman and CEO of Fox News) (Warren)
 Mary Towne Burt (temperance reformer, newspaper publisher of Our Union) (Cincinnati)
 Nettie Sanford Chapin (newspaper publisher of The Ladies Bureau) (Portage County)
 Ethlyn T. Clough publisher and editor of The Brooklyn Exponent) (Monroeville)
 James M. Cox (publisher of Dayton Daily News, founder of Cox Communications, politician) (Jacksonburg)
 Larry Flynt (publisher of Hustler adult magazine) (Cincinnati)
 Lorin Morgan-Richards (author and publisher of Celtic Family Magazine) (Strongsville/Beebetown)
 Adolph Ochs (former owner of The New York Times) (Cincinnati)
 Esther Pritchard (minister; editor and publisher of the Friend's Missionary Advocate) (Morrow County)
 Esther Pugh (temperance reformer; editor and publisher of Our Union) (Cincinnati)
 Ted Turner (founder of Turner Broadcasting, CNN) (Cincinnati)
 Jack L. Warner (co-founder of Warner Bros. Studios) (Youngstown)
 Les Wexner (chairman and CEO of Limited Brands) (Dayton/New Albany)

Activists, philanthropists, public agitators, advocates, lawyers

 Rosa Miller Avery (abolitionist, reformer, writer) ((Madison)
 Daniel Carter Beard (founder of The Boy Scouts of America) (Cincinnati)
 Elizabeth Blackwell (abolitionist, women's rights activist, first female doctor in U.S.) (Cincinnati)
 John Brown (abolitionist) (Hudson)
 Alice A. W. Cadwallader (philanthropist and temperance activist) (St. Clairsville)
 Rebecca Ballard Chambers (temperance reformer) (Ohio)
 Annie W. Clark (social reformer)
 Sara Jane Crafts (educator, author, social reformer) (Cincinnati)
 Ronald Daniels (activist) (Youngstown)
 Clarence Seward Darrow (lawyer, leading member of the ACLU) (Kinsman)
 Richard Dillingham (Quaker abolitionist) (Morrow County)
 Susanna M. D. Fry (educator, social reformer) (Burlington)
 Albert B. Graham (founder of 4-H) (Springfield, Clark County)
 Linda Hirshman (lawyer, feminist) (Cleveland)
 Esther T. Housh (social reformer, magazine editor) (Ross County)
 William Alexander Morgan (fought in the Cuban Revolution) (Cleveland/Toledo)
 Carl Oglesby (activist) (Akron)
 Madalyn Murray O'Hair (activist) (Rossford)
 John Oller (attorney, writer, biographer) (Huron)
 Alice E. Heckler Peters (social reformer) (Dayton)
 Utah Phillips (labor organizer) (Cleveland)
 Achilles Pugh (publisher of The Philanthropist; anti-slavery activist) (Cadiz, Waynesville, Cincinnati)
 Laura Rockefeller (abolitionist, philanthropist) (Wadsworth)
 Martha Parmelee Rose (1834–1923) (journalist, social reformer, philanthropist) (Norton)
 Rick Alan Ross (deprogrammer) (Cleveland)
 Jerry Rubin ('60s, '70s radical activist) (Cincinnati)
 Lee Saunders (labor leader) (Cleveland)
 Bob Smith (doctor, founder of Alcoholics Anonymous) (Akron)
 Gloria Steinem (feminist) (Toledo)
 Lillian Wald (activist) (Cincinnati)
 Irvin F. Westheimer (founder of Big Brothers Big Sisters)
 Raymond Winbush (scholar, activist) (Cleveland)
 Victoria Woodhull (activist, stockbroker, journalist, politician) (Homer/Mount Gilead)

Criminals

 Robert Bales (Kandahar massacre perpetrator) (Norwood)
 Ariel Castro (rapist and kidnapper) (Cleveland)
 Jeffrey Dahmer (serial killer) (lived in Bath)
 Donald DeFreeze (Patty Hearst kidnapper) (Cleveland)
 Thomas Dillon (serial killer) (Canton)
 Martin Frankel (financier) (Toledo)
 Jimmy Fratianno (mobster) (Cleveland)
 Shawn Grate (serial killer) (Ashland, Mansfield, Marion)
 Danny Greene (mobster) Cleveland
 Gary M. Heidnik (rapist, kidnapper, murderer) (Eastlake)
 James Oliver Huberty (murderer) (Massillon)
 Anthony Kirkland (Cincinnati serial killer)
 Samuel Little (serial killer) (Lorain)
 Jeffrey Don Lundgren (cult leader, murderer) Kirtland
 Charles Makley (bank robber) (Saint Marys)
 Charles Manson (convicted murderer, cult/commune leader) (Cincinnati/Walnut Hills)
 Carmen Milano (mobster) (Cleveland)
 Peter Milano (mobster) (Cleveland)
 Anthony Sowell (rapist and serial killer) (Cleveland)

Educators, religious leaders, lecturers, motivational speakers, self-help gurus

 Aaron Brumbaugh (president of Shimer College) (Hartville)
 Cynthia S. Burnett (educator and temperance reformer) (Niles)
 John Lewis Dyer (Methodist circuit rider in Minnesota and Colorado; considered one of 16 founders of Colorado) (born in Franklin County)
 Yusuf Estes (Islamic scholar) (born in Ohio)
 William Holmes McGuffey (educator, author) (Tuscarawas County/Oxford/Cincinnati)
 Raymond Moley (professor, member of FDR's "Brain Trust", author) (Berea)
 Norman Vincent Peale (author, professional speaker, clergyman) (Bowersville)
 Michelle Rhee (educator, education reform leader) (Toledo)
 William P. Richardson (co-founder and first Dean of Brooklyn Law School) (Farmer Center)
 William Strunk Jr. (educator, author) (Cincinnati)
 Tenskwatawa (religious and political leader of the Shawnee Indians) (Ross County)

Scholars, scientists, historians, theorists, philosophers, opinionists

 Zoltan Acs (economist) (Cleveland)
 Mary Ainsworth (psychologist) (Glendale)
 Gordon Allport (psychologist) (Cleveland)
 James B. Anderson (chemical engineer) (Cleveland)
 Edgar Bain (metallurgist) (LaRue)
 Richard C. Banks (ornithologist) (Steubenville)
 Brand Blanshard (philosopher) (Fredericksburg)
 Michael Brooks (historian, journalist) (Toledo)
 William Merriam Burton (chemist) (Cleveland)
 William Campbell (astronomer) (Hancock County)
 Richard E. Caves (economist) (Akron)
 Neil W. Chamberlain (economist) (Lakewood)
 Walker Lee Cisler (mechanical engineer) (Marietta)
 John R. Commons (economist, historian) (Hollansburg)
 Gustav Eckstein (writer, medical doctor, psychologist)
 Thomas Alva Edison (scientist, inventor)
 William A. Fowler (physicist, Nobel Prize Winner) (The Ohio State University, Lima)
 Marye Anne Fox (organic chemist) (Canton)
 James J. Gibson (psychologist) (McConnelsville)
 Rosetta Luce Gilchrist (physician, writer) (Kingsville)
 Donald A. Glaser (physicist, Nobel Prize Winner) (Cleveland)
 Irving I. Gottesman (psychologist, behavioral geneticist) (Cleveland)
 Charles Martin Hall (inventor, engineer) (Thompson)
 Samuel Dana Horton (monetary theorist)
 Charles Kettering (inventor, engineer) (Loudonville)
 Thomas Kuhn (philosopher of science) (Cincinnati)
 Arthur Laffer (supply-side economist) (Youngstown)
 Harry March (football historian, doctor) (New Franklin/Canton)
 Albert A. Michelson (physicist) (Case Institute of Technology)
 Virginia Minnich (biologist) (Zanesville)
 Dorothea Rhodes Lummis Moore (physician, newspaper editor) (Chillicothe)
 Garrett Morgan (inventor) (Cleveland)
 Edward W. Morley (physicist) (Western Reserve University)
 Ralph Paffenbarger (epidemiologist) (Columbus)
 Roy J. Plunkett (chemist) (New Carlisle)
 Willard Van Orman Quine (logician and philosopher) (Akron)
 Joseph Ransohoff (neurosurgeon, inventor) (Cincinnati)
 Frederick Rentschler (aviation engineer) (Hamilton)
 Charles Richter (physicist) (Overpeck)
 Frank Sherwood Rowland (chemist, Nobel Prize Winner) (Delaware)
 Arthur M. Schlesinger, Sr. (historian) (Xenia)
 Zalman Shapiro (chemist, inventor) (Canton)
 Thomas Sherwood (chemical engineer) (Columbus)
 Thomas J. Silhavy (molecular biologist) (Wauseon)
 Richard Smalley (chemist, Nobel Prize Winner) (Akron)
 Oberlin Smith (engineer, magnetic recording pioneer) (Cincinnati)
 Lee Smolin (theoretical physicist) (Cincinnati)
 George Smoot (astrophysicist, Nobel Prize Winner) (Upper Arlington)
 Sander Vanocur (commentator) (Cleveland)
 John S. Wilson (economist) (Lakewood)
 Elizabeth Witherell (editor-in-chief of The Writings of Henry D. Thoreau) (Toledo)
 Michael S. Witherell (particle physicist, president of Fermilab) (Toledo)
 Richard D. Wolff (Marxist economist) (Youngstown)
 Allyn Abbott Young (economist) (Kenton)

Singers, musicians, composers, songwriters, conductors

A–C

 Rita Abrams (songwriter-performer-writer) (Cleveland)
 Lee Adams (Broadway lyricist) (Mansfield)
 Leslie Adams [H. Leslie Adams] (composer) (Cleveland)
 Steven Adler (musician, original drummer, Guns N' Roses) (Cleveland)
 Harley Allen (singer-songwriter) (Dayton)
 Ray Anthony (musician) (Cleveland)
 Joseph Arthur (musician) (Akron)
 Dan Auerbach (guitarist and singer, The Black Keys) (Akron)
 Avant (musician) (Cleveland)
 Albert Ayler (musician) (Cleveland)
 David Baerwald (musician) (Oxford)
 Benny Bailey (jazz trumpeter) (Cleveland)
 Anita Baker (singer) (Toledo)
 Julius Baker (classical flutist) (Cleveland)
 Bobby Bare (singer) (Ironton)
 Lou Barlow (musician) (Dayton)
 John Bassette (singer, musician) (Cleveland)
 Stiv Bators (musician) (Youngstown)
 Kathleen Battle (opera singer) (Portsmouth)
 Margaret Baxtresser (classical pianist) (Kent)
 Andy Biersack (singer) (Cincinnati)
 Cindy Blackman (musician) (Yellow Springs)
 Bow Wow (rapper) (Reynoldsburg)
 Crystal Bowersox (musician) (Toledo)
 Don Braden (jazz saxophonist) (Cincinnati)
 Tiny Bradshaw (jazz bandleader) (Youngstown)
 Teresa Brewer (singer) (Toledo)..
 Jim Brickman (musician, songwriter) (Cleveland)
 Jerry Brightman (producer, musician, Buck Owens) (Akron)
 Dave Burrell (jazz pianist) (Middletown)
 Chris Butler (musician, The Waitresses) (Akron)
 Billy Butterfield (jazz trumpeter) (Middletown)
 Glen Buxton (guitarist, original Alice Cooper band) (Akron)
 Casey Calvert (vocalist, Hawthorne Heights) (Dayton)
 Eric Carmen (musician) (Cleveland)
 Patrick Carney (drummer and producer, The Black Keys) (Akron)
 Ralph Carney (saxophonist) (Akron)
 Lionel Cartwright (musician, singer) (Gallipolis)
 Gerald Casale (musician) (Kent)
 Tracy Chapman (singer-songwriter) (Cleveland)
 Cheetah Chrome (musician, Dead Boys) (Cleveland)
 Charles W. Clark (operatic singer, vocalist teacher) (Van Wert)
 Gilby Clarke (musician) (Cleveland)
 Tammy Cochran (singer) (Austinburg)
 David Allan Coe (singer, musician) (Akron)
 Marc Cohn (singer) (Cleveland)
 Bootsy Collins (musician) (Cincinnati)
 Earl Thomas Conley (singer) (Portsmouth)
 Cowboy Copas (singer) (Adams County)
 Susan Cowsill (singer) (Canton)
 Stanley Cowell (jazz pianist) (Toledo)
 Gavin Creel (singer) (Findlay)

D–I

 Tadd Dameron (jazz composer) (Cleveland)
 Dorothy Dandridge (singer, actress) (Cleveland)
 Dennis Russell Davies (orchestral conductor) (Toledo)
 Bill Davison (jazz cornetist) (Defiance)
 Doris Day (big band singer, actress) (Cincinnati)
 Kelley Deal (musician, The Breeders) (Huber Heights/Dayton)
 Kim Deal (musician, The Breeders) (Huber Heights/Dayton)
 Bill DeArango (jazz guitarist) (Cleveland)
 Jay DeMarcus (singer, bassist and keyboardist, Rascal Flatts) (Columbus)
 Paul DeMarinis (electronic music composer) (Cleveland)
 Jerry DePizzo (saxophonist, O.A.R.) (Youngstown)
 Rick Derringer (singer) (Fort Recovery)
 Frank DeVol (composer, actor) (Canton)
 Greg Dewey (drummer, Country Joe and the Fish) (Yellow Springs)
 Vic Dickenson (jazz trombonist) (Xenia)
 Bethany Dillon (Christian singer-songwriter) (Bellefontaine)
 Martin Dillon (tenor and music professor) (Portsmouth)
 Patty Donahue (singer, The Waitresses) (Akron)
 Mark S. Doss (operatic bass-baritone) (Cleveland)
 Jerry Douglas (musician) (Warren)
 Greg Dulli (singer, musician) (Hamilton)
 Josh Dun (drummer, Twenty One Pilots) (Columbus)
 Harry Edison (jazz trumpeter) (Columbus)
 Halim El-Dabh (composer, musician, ethnomusicologist) (Kent)
 James Emery (jazz guitarist) (Youngstown, Shaker Heights)
 Donald Erb (composer) (Youngstown)
 Eric Ewazen (composer) (Cleveland)
 Michael Feinstein (singer) (Columbus)
 Frederick Fennell (band conductor) (Cleveland)
 Jim Ferguson (classical and jazz guitarist) (Dayton)
 Bobby Few (jazz pianist) (Cleveland)
 Anton Fier (drummer, The Golden Palominos) (Cleveland)
 Henry Fillmore (composer) (Cincinnati)
 Frank Foster (jazz saxophonist and bandleader) (Cincinnati)
 Mark Foster (singer, Foster the People) (Cleveland)
 Craig Fuller (musician) (Waverly, Columbus)
 Larry Fuller (jazz pianist) (Toledo)
 Sonny Geraci (singer) Outsiders (Climax) (Cleveland)
 Neil Giraldo (guitarist, songwriter) (Cleveland)
 Jeff Golub (jazz guitarist) (Copley)
 Macy Gray (singer) (Canton)
 Max Green (musician) (Cincinnati)
 Joel Grey (singer, actor, dancer) (Cleveland)
 Dave Grohl (musician, Nirvana and Foo Fighters (Warren)
 Clare Grundman (composer and arranger) (Cleveland)
 Keith Harrison (singer, musician, Dazz Band (Dayton)
 Screamin' Jay Hawkins (musician) (Cleveland)
 J.C. Heard (drummer) (Dayton)
 Joe Henderson (jazz saxophonist) (Lima)
 Jon Hendricks (jazz singer and arranger) (Newark)
 Fred Hersch (jazz pianist) (Cincinnati)
 Howard Hewett (singer, Shalamar) (Akron)
 J.C. Higginbotham (jazz trombonist) (Cincinnati)
 Christian Howes (jazz violinist) (Rocky River)
 Pee Wee Hunt (jazz trombonist) (Mount Healthy)
 Chrissie Hynde (musician) (Akron)
 James Ingram (singer-songwriter, musician) (Akron)
 Sonya Isaacs (singer) (Morrow)
 Ernie Isley (singer) (Cincinnati)
 Ron Isley (singer) (Cincinnati)
 Chuck Israels (jazz bassist) (Cleveland)

J–M

 Tommy James (musician) (Dayton)
 Al Jardine (musician, The Beach Boys) (Lima)
 Lyfe Jennings (R&B musician) (Toledo)
 Howard Jones (lead singer, Killswitch Engage) (Columbus)
 Tyler Joseph (musician, singer, Twenty One Pilots) (Columbus)
 K808 (music producer) (Youngstown)
 Mickey Katz (clarinetist, comedian) (Cleveland)
 Sammy Kaye (swing bandleader) (Lakewood)
 Phil Keaggy (musician, Glass Harp) (Youngstown)
 Maynard James Keenan (musician, lead singer, Tool and A Perfect Circle) (Ravenna)
 Machine Gun Kelly (rapper) (Cleveland)
 Emily Keener (singer, musician) (Wakeman)
 Khaledzou (music producer) (Youngstown)
 Kid Cudi (musician) (Cleveland)
 Karl King (band composer and conductor) (Paintersville)
 Roland Kirk (musician) (Columbus)
 Chris Kirkpatrick (singer) (Dalton)
 Mark Kozelek (singer, musician) (Massillon)
 Josh Krajcik (singer, musician) (Wooster)
 Kramies (singer-songwriter, recording artist) (Cleveland)
 Ernie Krivda (jazz saxophonist) (Cleveland)
 Erich Kunzel (classical conductor) (Cincinnati)
 Drew Lachey (musician) (Cincinnati)
 Nick Lachey (musician) (Cincinnati)
 Jani Lane (musician, Warrant) (Akron)
 Neil Larsen (keyboardist) (Cleveland)
 Peter Laughner (musician, Rocket from the Tombs) (Bay Village)
 Griffin Layne (recording artist, singer-songwriter) (Kettering)
 John Legend (musician) (Springfield)
 Gerald Levert (R&B singer) (Cleveland)
 James Levine (conductor, musician) (Cincinnati)
 Gary LeVox (lead singer, Rascal Flatts) (Columbus/Lewis Center)
 Bob Lewis (musician) (Akron)
 Ted Lewis (bandleader) (Circleville)
 Lexi (gospel singer) (Canton)
 Tommy LiPuma (music production) (Cleveland)
 Robert Lockwood Jr. (bluesman) (Cleveland)
 Ty Longley (musician, guitarist, Great White) (Brookfield)
 Lux Interior (born Erick Purkhiser) (musician) (Stow)
 John Mack (classical oboist) (Cleveland)
 Eli Maiman (guitarist, Walk the Moon) (Cincinnati)
 Henry Mancini (composer) (Cleveland)
 Marilyn Manson (musician) (Canton)
 Brad Martin (singer) (Greenfield)
 Dean Martin (singer, actor) (Steubenville)
 Jessica Lea Mayfield (musician) (Kent)
 Maureen McGovern (singer) (Youngstown)
 Dottie McGuire (singer, The McGuire Sisters) (Middletown)
 Phyllis McGuire (singer, The McGuire Sisters) (Middletown)
 Ruby McGuire (singer, The McGuire Sisters) (Middletown)
 Allen McKenzie (bass guitar, singer, FireHouse) (Jackson)
 Andrew McMahon (musician, lead singer, Something Corporate and Jack's Mannequin) (Bexley)
 Sylvia McNair (classical singer) (Mansfield)
 MGK (rapper) (Cleveland)
 Donald Mills (musician, The Mills Brothers) (Piqua)
 Harry Mills (musician, The Mills Brothers) (Piqua)
 Herbert Mills (musician, The Mills Brothers) (Piqua)
 John Mills Jr. (musician, The Mills Brothers) (Piqua)
 John Hutchinson Mills (musician, The Mills Brothers) (Piqua)
 Jason Molina (musician) (Oberlin)
 Vaughn Monroe (singer) (Akron)
 Junie Morrison (lead singer, Ohio Players) (Dayton)
 Seth Morrison (guitar) (Wheelersburg)
 Bob Mothersbaugh (musician, Devo) (Akron)
 Mark Mothersbaugh (musician, Devo) (Akron)
 Shirley Murdock (singer) (Toledo)
 Frank J. Myers (singer-songwriter) (Dayton)

N–R

 Ruby Nash Garnett (singer, Ruby & the Romantics) (Akron)
 Bern Nix (jazz guitarist) (Toledo)
 Russell Oberlin (classical singer) (Akron)
 Phil Ochs (protest singer) (Columbus)
 Jamie O'Hara (singer-songwriter) (Toledo)
 Benjamin Orr (musician, The Cars) (Lakewood)
 Tim "Ripper" Owens (singer, Judas Priest) (Akron)
 Gary Patterson (musician) (Cleveland)
 Johnny Paycheck (singer) (Greenfield)
 Danielle Peck (singer) (Coshocton)
 Ken Peplowski (jazz saxophonist) (Cleveland)
 Nicholas Petricca (singer-songwriter, musician) (Cincinnati)
 Utah Phillips (folk singer) (Cleveland)
 Robert Pollard (composer) (Dayton)
 John Popper (singer, Blues Traveler (Cleveland)
 Steve Potts (jazz saxophonist) (Columbus)
 Robert Quine (guitarist, Richard Hell and the Voidoids) (Akron)
 Joshua Radin (singer-songwriter) (Shaker Heights)
 Chuck Rainey (bassist, Steely Dan) (Cleveland)
 Kevin Ray (musician, Walk the Moon) (Columbus)
 Trippie Redd (rapper) (Canton)
 Conrad Reeder (singer-songwriter) (Columbus)
 Antonio "L.A." Reid (record executive, songwriter, producer) (Cincinnati)
 Alvino Rey (bandleader) (Cleveland)
 Trent Reznor (musician, Nine Inch Nails) (Cleveland)
 Marty Roe (lead singer, Diamond Rio) (Lebanon)
 Roy Rogers (singer, actor) (Cincinnati, Portsmouth, Lucasville, McDermott)

 Vanessa Rubin (jazz singer) (Cleveland)
 George Russell (jazz composer) (Cincinnati)
 John Morris Russell (classical conductor) (Cleveland, Cincinnati)

S–Z

 JD Samson (musician, Le Tigre) (Cleveland)
 Scott Savol (singer) (Cleveland)
 Boz Scaggs (singer-songwriter) (Canton)
 Tom Scholz (musician, inventor) (Toledo)
 John Scofield (jazz-rock guitarist) (Dayton)
 Jimmy Scott (jazz singer) (Cleveland)
 Brady Seals (musician) (Fairfield)
 Ruth Crawford Seeger (modernist composer) (East Liverpool)
 Philip Setzer (classical violinist, Emerson String Quartet) (Cleveland)
 Bud Shank (jazz saxophonist) (Dayton)
 Elliott Sharp (guitarist, saxophonist) (Cleveland)
 Scott Shriner (musician, Weezer) (Toledo)
 Eric Singer (musician, Kiss) (Cleveland)
 Connie Smith (singer) (Marietta)
 Hale Smith (jazz composer) (Cleveland)
 Mamie Smith (singer) (Cincinnati)
 Stuff Smith (jazz violinist) (Portsmouth)
 Robert Spano (orchestral conductor) (Conneaut)
 Stalley (rapper) (Massilon)
 Michael Stanley (musician) (Cleveland)
 Billy Strayhorn (jazz composer) (Dayton)
 Rachel Sweet (musician) (Akron)
 Chad Szeliga (drummer, Breaking Benjamin) (Elyria)
 George Szell (orchestral conductor) (Cleveland)
 Art Tatum (jazz pianist) (Toledo)
 Danny Thomas (singer, comedian) (Toledo)
 David Thomas (musician) (Akron)
 Charles Thompson (jazz pianist) (Springfield)
 Jeff Timmons (singer-songwriter, producer) (Cleveland)
 Joe Trohman (guitarist, Fall Out Boy (South Russell)
 Roger Troutman (musician, singer-songwriter) (Dayton/Hamilton)
 Mark Turner (jazz saxophonist) (Fairborn)
 Kate Voegele (singer-songwriter, musician) (Bay Village)
 Abdul Wadud (jazz cellist) (Cleveland)
 Scott Walker (singer, The Walker Brothers) (Hamilton)
 Joe Walsh (musician) (Kent, Cleveland)
 Robert Ward (classical composer) (Cleveland)
 Earle Warren (jazz saxophonist) (Springfield)
 Sean Waugaman (drummer, Walk the Moon) (Columbus)
 Jeff Weaver (musician) (Athens)
 Scott Weiland (musician) (Cleveland)
 Jiggs Whigham (jazz trombonist) (Cleveland)
 Vesta Williams (singer) (Coshocton)
 John Finley Williamson (choral conductor) (Canton, Dayton)
 Nancy Wilson (singer) (Chillicothe)
 Bobby Womack (singer) (Cleveland)
 JT Woodruff (singer, Hawthorne Heights) (Dayton)
 Frank Yankovic (musician) (Cleveland)
 Jimmy Yeary (singer) (Hillsboro)
 Dwight Yoakam (singer, actor) (Columbus)
 Snooky Young (jazz trumpeter) (Dayton)

See also

 List of people from Akron, Ohio
 List of people from Ashtabula, Ohio
 List of people from Cincinnati
 List of people from Cleveland
 List of people from Columbus, Ohio
 List of people from Dayton, Ohio
 List of people from Shaker Heights, Ohio
 List of people from Toledo, Ohio
 List of people from Youngstown, Ohio
 List of Ohio suffragists

References